The geared turbofan is a type of turbofan aircraft engine, with a gearbox between the fan and the low pressure shaft to spin each at optimum angular velocities. The benefit of the design is lower fuel consumption and much quieter operation. The drawback is that it increases weight and adds complexity.

Technology
In a conventional turbofan, a single shaft (the "low-pressure" or LP shaft) connects the fan, the low-pressure compressor and the low-pressure turbine (a second concentric shaft connects the high-pressure compressor and high-pressure turbine). In this configuration, the maximum tip speed for the larger radius fan limits the rotational speed for the LP shaft and thus the LP compressor and turbine. At high bypass ratios (and thus high radius ratios) the tip speeds of the LP turbine and LP compressor must be relatively low, which means extra compressor and turbine stages are required to keep the average stage loadings and, therefore, overall component efficiencies to an acceptable level.

In a geared turbofan, a planetary reduction gearbox between the fan and the LP shaft allows the latter to run at a higher rotational speed thus enabling fewer stages to be used in both the LP turbine and the LP compressor, increasing efficiency and reducing weight. However, some energy will be lost as heat in the gear mechanism and weight saved on turbine and compressor stages is partly offset by that of the gearbox. There are manufacturing cost and reliability implications as well.

The lower fan speed allows higher bypass ratios, leading to reduced fuel consumption and much reduced noise. The BAe 146 is fitted with geared turbofans and is still one of the quietest commercial aircraft. A large part of the noise reduction is due to reduced fan tip speeds. In conventional turbofans the fan tips exceed the speed of sound causing a characteristic drone, requiring sound deadening. Geared turbofans operate the fan at sufficiently low rotational speed to avoid supersonic tip speeds.

History 
After considering a geared design, General Electric decided against it for its CFM LEAP due to weight and reliability concerns, postponing its use for a future application, after Pratt & Whitney began development of the geared PW1000G.

Engines

 Garrett TFE731
 Lycoming ALF 502/LF 507
 Pratt & Whitney PW1000G
 Rolls-Royce UltraFan
 Turbomeca Astafan
 Turbomeca Aspin

Tentatives

 Rolls-Royce/SNECMA M45SD, a derivative of Rolls-Royce/SNECMA M45H turbofan, designed to demonstrate ultra-quiet engine technologies, needed for STOL aircraft operating from city centre airports
 IAE SuperFan, an IAE V2500 derivative proposed for the Airbus A340 between 1987 and 1992
 Aviadvigatel PD-18R, a derivative of the gearless PD-14, based on its high-temperature core, to be completed by 2020

See also

References

Notes

Bibliography

 
 Francillon, René J. McDonnell Douglas Aircraft since 1920. London: Putnam, 1979. .
 

 
Turbofan engines